Cynthia Dill (born January 6, 1965) is an American lawyer and politician from Maine. A member of the Democratic Party, she served in the Maine House of Representatives and Maine Senate, representing the 7th district which is composed of South Portland, her hometown of Cape Elizabeth, and a small portion of Scarborough.

Dill was the 2012 Democratic nominee to replace outgoing Senator Olympia Snowe and represent Maine in the United States Senate, but came in third in the general election behind former independent governor Angus King and Republican Secretary of State Charlie Summers.

Life, education, and career
Dill is married and has two children. She received her bachelor's degree from the University of Vermont and her J.D. from Northeastern University School of Law.

Dill is an adjunct instructor at Southern Maine Community College, a civil rights lawyer, and the director of the Common Cause Digital Democracy Project.  She served on the Cape Elizabeth Town Council.  While serving on the Town Council, Dill said her priority was to protect and support the state's businesses and natural resources and the elderly, disabled and children. She voted to support gay marriage and said she would "happily and without reservation" support it if the issue would come up again.  She strongly supported education, saying, "I am committed to improving the education funding formula and more importantly making needed reforms to education as a whole."

Maine House of Representatives

Elections
Dill was first elected to the Maine House of Representatives in 2006 to represent Maine's 121st House District, based in Cape Elizabeth. She defeated Republican nominee Jennifer Duddy 52%-48%. In 2008, she won re-election to a second term with 61% of the vote. In 2010, she won re-election to a third term with 58% of the vote.

Tenure
She was a leading proponent of the Three Ring Binder Project, a nationally recognized private/public partnership that will bring high-speed Internet access to rural parts.

Committee assignments
She served on the Joint Standing Committee on Judiciary and the House  Ethics Committees

Maine Senate

Elections
Following the resignation of State Senator Larry Bliss in 2011, Dill won a special election to replace Bliss, defeating former Republican State Representative Louie Maietta 68%-32%.

Tenure
Dill is a strong supporter of same-sex marriage. In November 2011, Dill formed a group, "The Friends of the Maine Woods", to support Roxanne Quimby's bid to donate land to create a national park in the Millinocket region of Maine. The town council of Millinocket and the Maine State Legislature passed resolutions opposing the creation of the proposed national park.

Committee assignments
She served on the Joint Standing Committee on Judiciary.

2012 U.S. Senate election

In January 2012, Dill announced that she would seek the Democratic Party's nomination for the U.S. Senate then held by incumbent Republican U.S. Senator Olympia Snowe.

Dill won a four-way Democratic Senate primary on June 12, 2012. She faced Republican Charlie Summers, independent candidates Angus King and Danny Dalton, and Libertarian Party-affiliated independent Andrew Ian Dodge in the November election, in which King was victorious.

References

External links 
 

1965 births
Living people
Maine lawyers
Maine local politicians
Democratic Party Maine state senators
Democratic Party members of the Maine House of Representatives
Northeastern University School of Law alumni
People from Cape Elizabeth, Maine
Southern Maine Community College faculty
University of Vermont alumni
Women state legislators in Maine
21st-century American women